Colonel Holloway (foaled in 1909) was an American Thoroughbred racehorse best known for winning the 1912 Preakness Stakes.

Background
Colonel Holloway was bred by Catesby Woodford of Raceland Farm near Paris, Kentucky and raced by Frank J. Nolan's Beverwyck Stable. He was trained by Dave Woodford.

Racing career
For his Preakness win, Colonel Holloway was ridden by  jockey Clarence Turner. Colonel Holloway was not among the original entries for the race, but was added to the field after winning the Maryland Club purse earlier in the day. He started at odds of 8/5 and won from Bwana Tumbo and Tipsand. The race was run as a handicap, with Colonel Holloway carrying 107 pounds, thirteen pounds less than the runner-up. Records show the colt ran second to Sotemia in the four mile Kentucky Endurance Stakes in October of the same year.

As of 1915, Colonel Holloway was still racing in the United States and in Canada. His owner was listed as D.J. Scanlon. By 1920, Colonel Holloway was still racing at Timonium, Maryland but was considered to be no longer in good physical condition by the press.

After racing
No records have been found of any progeny of Colonel Holloway or of his death.

Pedigree

Colonel Holloway was inbred 4 × 4 to Lord Clifden, meaning that this stallion appears twice in the fourth generation of his pedigree.

References

1909 racehorse births
Racehorses bred in Kentucky
Racehorses trained in the United States
Preakness Stakes winners
Thoroughbred family 4-k